Cicaré S.A. (originally Cicaré Aeronáutica S.A. and later Cicaré Helicópteros S.A.) is an Argentine helicopter manufacturer founded by Augusto Cicaré in Saladillo, Buenos Aires Province in the 1970s to develop aircraft of his own design. A number of prototypes were constructed, including one under contract from the Argentine Air Force, but no great successes were achieved until the CH-7 light sporting helicopter in the 1990s.

In March 2007, the first prototype of a Cicaré CH-14, a light helicopter for the Argentine Army, was ready. On March 18, 2010, they presented the CH-7B and CH-12 during the EAA Argentina Annual Meeting.

The company exports to Europe, Australia, the Middle East, Taiwan, China and Alaska.

Products

Former aircraft
 CH-1 (1961)
 CH-2 (1964)
 CH-3 Colibri (1976)
 CH-4 (1982)
 CH-5 AG (1986)
 CH-6 (1987)
 CH-6T (1999)
 CH-8 UL (1993)
 CH-9 (1995)
 CH-11 – Coaxial helicopter
 CH-14 – (2007) One prototype built. Defense, turbine engine

Helicopter trainer
 Cicaré SVH-4 – It is a conventional helicopter design attached to a mobile ground platform, which allows the use of all flight controls including lift off to a normal hover at 3 ft AGL and hover taxiing. The platform has eight free rotating wheels which allow moves in all directions; and an air tank that has pneumatic cylinders which allow the helicopter to rise and descend adjusting the level of difficulty during learning.

Present aircraft

Engines
 Cicaré 4C2T (1973)

See also
 AeroDreams
 RACA S.A.

References

Source

External links

 Company website
 Cicare coaxial helicopter CH-11
 Brief entry/blog (also in Spanish)
 Cicare at Helis.com

 
Defense companies of Argentina
Helicopter manufacturers of Argentina
Vehicle manufacturing companies established in 1972
Argentine brands
1972 establishments in Argentina